Phidippus mystaceus is a species of jumping spider that is found in North America.

Etymology
The species name is derived from the Ancient Greek mystax, meaning "moustache", which the females of this species feature. An older synonym of the species is P. asinarius, referring to the markings above the eyes that look similar to donkey ears.

References

Further reading
Roach, S.H. (1988). Reproductive periods of Phidippus species (Araneae, Salticidae) in South Carolina. Journal of Arachnology 16:95-101. PDF

External links

Many pictures of P. mystaceus at BugGuide

Salticidae
Spiders of North America
Spiders described in 1846
Taxa named by Nicholas Marcellus Hentz